Juan Antonio Flores Santana (July 3, 1927 – November 9, 2014) was a Roman Catholic archbishop.

Ordained to the priesthood on July 12, 1952, Flores Santana was named bishop of the Roman Catholic Diocese of La Vega, Dominican Republic, on April 24, 1966, and was ordained bishop of June 12, 1966. On June 13, 1992, he was appointed bishop of the Roman Catholic Diocese of Santiago de los Caballeros and then archbishop of the same diocese on February 14, 1994, from which he retired on July 16, 2003.

Notes

External links

1927 births
2014 deaths
20th-century Roman Catholic bishops in the Dominican Republic
21st-century Roman Catholic bishops in the Dominican Republic
Roman Catholic bishops of La Vega
Roman Catholic bishops of Santiago de los Caballeros
Roman Catholic archbishops of Santiago de los Caballeros